Life at Best is the third studio album by American country music group Eli Young Band. It was released on August 16, 2011 via Republic Nashville. The album includes the number one singles "Crazy Girl" and "Even If It Breaks Your Heart" as well as "Say Goodnight", which peaked at number 22 on the Country Airplay Chart. According to HITS Daily Double, the album sold 348,000 copies as of February 2014.

Reception

Critical
Giving it four stars out of five, Steve Morley of Country Weekly said that the album "rings with roots-rock guitars and meaty, often melancholy themes". A less favorable review came from Andrew Leahey of AllMusic, who thought that it was a "step backwards" because he did not consider its songs as memorable as those on Jet Black & Jealous.

Track listing

Personnel
Adapted from the Life at Best liner notes.

Eli Young Band
Mike Eli – guitar, lead vocals
Jon Jones – bass guitar, background vocals
Chris Thompson – drums, percussion
James Young – lead guitar, harmonica, background vocals

Production
Eric Tonkin – assistant engineer
Nick Kallstrom – assistant engineer
Mark Dobson – digital editing
Mike Wrucke – mixing
Richard Dodd – mastering

Additional musicians
Eric Darken – percussion
Fred Eltringham – percussion 
Kree Harrison – background vocals 
Natalie Hemby – background vocals
Greg Leisz – steel guitar
Tony Obrohta – guitar
Russ Pahl – steel guitar
Oran Thornton – guitar
Michael Webb – Hammond B-3 organ, keyboards
Mike Wrucke – guitar, steel guitar, harmonica, mandolin, background vocals

Chart performance

Weekly charts

Year-end charts

Singles

References

2011 albums
Eli Young Band albums
Republic Records albums
Albums produced by Frank Liddell